The BL 12-inch Mark XI and Mark XII gun were British breech loading (BL) naval guns of 50-calibres length mounted as primary armament on dreadnought battleships from 1910.

History 

In an effort to increase the armour-piercing capability and range of a 12-inch gun, the 50 calibres/600 inches Mk XI's barrel was 5 calibres/60 inches longer than the previous Mk X gun's 45 calibres. The Mk XII derived from it suffered from the same problems.

Instead of attempting to improve their 12-inch gun, the British developed the 13.5-inch Mk V gun of 45-calibres, which could achieve greater range at lower muzzle velocities due to its larger shell.

Mk XI guns were mounted on:
 St. Vincent-class battleships laid down 1907, commissioned 1910
 HMS Neptune laid down 1909, commissioned 1911

Mk XII guns were mounted on:
 Colossus-class battleships laid down 1909, commissioned 1911

See also 
 List of naval guns

Weapons of comparable role, performance and era 
 Obukhovskii 12"/52 Pattern 1907 gun Russian equivalent
 30.5 cm SK L/50 gun German equivalent
 Škoda 30.5 cm /45 K10 Austro-Hungarian equivalent

Notes

References

Bibliography 

 Tony DiGiulian, British 12"/50 (30.5 cm) Marks XI, XI* and XII

Naval guns of the United Kingdom
World War I naval weapons of the United Kingdom
305 mm artillery
Vickers